Paul Dwight Moody (April 11, 1879 – August 18, 1947), son of famed evangelical minister Dwight L. Moody, served as pastor at South Congregational Church in St. Johnsbury, Vermont from 1912 to 1917 and as the 10th president of Middlebury College from 1921 until 1943. During his tenure, two of Middlebury's most important institutions, the Bread Loaf School of English and the Middlebury College Language Schools saw growth in both quality and reputation. One of Moody's chief goals was the creation of a wholly separate women's college at Middlebury, as opposed to the semi-integrated system that had prevailed since women were first accepted in 1883. However, the Great Depression and World War II ultimately stymied his efforts at segregation by gender.

References

External links
 Time (magazine)
 Past Middlebury Presidents at www.middlebury.edu

Presidents of Middlebury College
1879 births
1947 deaths
People from Rutland County, Vermont